Tarazi or Al-Tarazi may refer to:

 Tarazi, Iran, a village in Ardabil Province
 Tarazi (surname), a surname and list of notable people or characters with the name